The  Laboratory School of Phranakhon Si Ayutthaya Rajabhat University (Rongrian Satit Mahawitthayalai Ratchaphat Phranakhon Si Ayutthaya), informally known as Satit Ayutthaya (Sathit Ayutthaya), is the first and only laboratory school (or demonstration school) in Phra Nakhon Si Ayutthaya Province, Thailand.

References

Schools in Thailand
Demonstration schools in Thailand
Phra Nakhon Si Ayutthaya province
Educational institutions established in 1985
1985 establishments in Thailand